Blythia is a genus of snakes of the superfamily Colubroidea.

Species
 Blythia hmuifang Vogel, Lalremsanga, & Vanlalhrima, 2017 - Mizoram ground snake
 Blythia reticulata (Blyth, 1854) - Blyth's reticulate snake

References

 
Snake genera
Taxa named by William Theobald